Maksar (also Romanized as Makşar; also known as Magsar, Maqsar, and Maqşer) is a village in Esmailiyeh Rural District, in the Central District of Ahvaz County, Khuzestan Province, Iran. At the 2006 census, its population was 326, in 53 families.

References 

Populated places in Ahvaz County